Kenneth Lewis "Red" Oberbruner (October 5, 1918 – September 6, 1991) was an American basketball and baseball player and college sports coach and administrator. He served as the head football coach at Milton College in Milton, Wisconsin from 1948 to 1961. Oberbruner was also the head baseball coach at the University of Wisconsin–Parkside in Kenosha, Wisconsin from 1970 to 1991.

Oberbruner played professional basketball for the Fort Wayne Zollner Pistons for two seasons—the first while it was an independent team and the next in the National Basketball League (NBL) during 1941–42. He averaged 2.2 points per game in the NBL.

Oberbruner was appointed head coach and director of physical education at Milton in 1948 after working as an assistant coach under Elmer Fenton the previous year. He remained athletic director and head coach of Milton's basketball and baseball teams until resigning in 1970. His basketball teams had a record of 257–198 and his baseball teams were 237–82.

After his days at Milton, Oberbruner was named the first coach in the history of the University of Wisconsin–Parkside baseball program in 1970. His teams were perennial All-District Tournament contenders, and he ended his career among the top-five NCAA Division II coaches in victories (254). He was inducted to the Wisconsin High School Baseball Coaches Association and the National Association of Intercollegiate Athletics District 14 Hall of Fame. After stepping down, the school named their baseball field in his honor on April 11, 1992. The Rangers played their home games at Oberbruner Field until moving to Simmons Field in 2019.

Oberbruner died on September 6, 1991, at his home in Burlington, Wisconsin.

Head coaching record

Football

References

1918 births
1991 deaths
American men's basketball players
Baseball catchers
Baseball players from Wisconsin
Basketball players from Wisconsin
Forwards (basketball)
Guards (basketball)
Fort Wayne Zollner Pistons players
Milton Wildcats athletic directors
Milton Wildcats baseball coaches
Milton Wildcats basketball coaches
Milton Wildcats football coaches
Notre Dame Fighting Irish baseball players
Notre Dame Fighting Irish men's basketball players
People from Ashland, Wisconsin
Wisconsin–Parkside Rangers baseball coaches
University of Wisconsin–Madison alumni